Kateryna Serdiuk (born September 16, 1989 in Kharkiv) is a Ukrainian cross-country skier.

Career
Serdiuk competed at the 2014 Winter Olympics for Ukraine. She placed 45th in the qualifying round in the sprint, failing to advance to the knockout stages. She was scheduled to compete in the team sprint with Maryna Lisohor, but did not start due to injury. The National Olympic Committee of Ukraine claimed Serdiuk was injured.

Serdiuk made her World Cup debut in November 2008. As of April 2014, her best finish is 11th, in a relay event at La Clusaz in 2008–09. Her best individual finish is 56th, in a freestyle mass start event at La Clusaz in 2008–09.

References

1989 births
Living people
Olympic cross-country skiers of Ukraine
Cross-country skiers at the 2014 Winter Olympics
Sportspeople from Kharkiv
Ukrainian female cross-country skiers
Universiade gold medalists for Ukraine
Universiade medalists in cross-country skiing
Competitors at the 2013 Winter Universiade
Competitors at the 2015 Winter Universiade
21st-century Ukrainian women